Goran Jevtić (born 18 January 1978) is a Serbian actor and director. During his two decade long career, Jevtić has composed a prolific range of performances notable in film, television and theater.

He is the recipient of various accolades, including the Ljubinka Bobić Award, the Zoran Radmilović Award, the Miloš Žutić Award, three Serbian Oscars of Popularity and four Ardalion Awards, as well as a Golden Arena for Best Supporting Actor nomination for his work in The Parade.

In October 2019, the Court of Appeals  in Sombor convicted  Jevtić of illegal sexual acts against a teenage male. He was sentenced to a ten-month house arrest instead of a prison sentence. The conviction was upheld in  March 2020.

Career

Jevtić was born in the settlement of Kovačevac in Mladenovac, SFR Yugoslavia. He began acting in 1998, and was since active in the Atelje 212 theatre in Belgrade. In 2001, he graduated from the Belgrade Academy of Dramatic Arts. A student of Biljana Mašić, his first role was Euclio in Aulularia. He later landed lead roles in various theatre productions, for which he earned numerous awards. His Shakespearean interpretations in European-based theatres include Romeo Montague in Romeo and Juliet' in Verona, Macbeth in Macbeth in Zagreb, Prince Hamlet in Hamlet in Belgrade, Antonio in The Merchant of Venice in Rome and Gaius Marcius Coriolanus in Coriolanus.

For his performance in Okamenjeni princ in the Duško Radović theatre, he received the Miloš Žutić Award. As Prince Hamlet in Hamlet, he won the Ardalion and the Serbian Oscar of Popularity in 2011. He was awarded the Serbian Oscar of Popularity again for his Romeo Montague interpretation at the Novi Sad Serbian National Theatre. The Noises Off rendition gained him a Zoran Radmilović Award and Ljubinka Bobić Award in 2014. He has taken part in over sixty international film and theatre festivals, and has completed over one hundred performances in the Atelje 212 theatre. He has performed in Moscow, London, Verona, Rome, Split, Budapest, Dresden, Vienna and Zagreb. In 2018, he starred as Friedrich Nietzsche in his directorial debut Kad je Niče zaplakao at Atelje 212.

He further rose to continental prominence as homosexual activist Mirko Dedijer, in the 2011 Festroia Award-winning film The Parade. The film by Srđan Dragojević reached commercial success, despite the controversial subject, and critics praised Jevtić's portrayal. Other than his role in The Parade, he actively appeared in the We're Not Angels films as fictional Leskovac native Andreja and played the supporting role of Mitar in the 2011 American war film In the Land of Blood and Honey directed by Angelina Jolie. He won the Apolon Prize in Belgrade for his role as Miloš in Life Is a Miracle entered into the 2004 Cannes Film Festival. He starred as Dane in the Srđan Dragojević production Sveti Georgije ubija aždahu in 2008, and in Na lijepom plavom Dunavu in 2009 as Jacek.

His repertoire on television includes Sisyphus in The Myth of Sisyphus from 2009 to 2011, cameo roles in Porodično blago, the secondary character Nebojša in Samo Era from 2008 to 2012, and Djoni in The Mask''.

Legal issues
In March 2019, the Court of Appeals in Sombor convicted Jevtić of illegal sexual acts against a 16 year old teenage male. Initially sentenced to ten months under house arrest, Jevtić's sentence was changed to ten months in prison in October 2019 following his appeal. However, a final verdict reversed the sentence and Jevtić began serving his sentence under house arrest in June 2020.

Filmography

Film roles

Television roles

Voice-over roles

Awards and nominations

References

External links 

1978 births
20th-century Serbian writers
21st-century Serbian writers
20th-century Serbian male actors
21st-century Serbian male actors
Dr. Branivoj Đorđević Award winners
Indexi Award winners
Living people
Ljubinka Bobić Award winners
Serbian LGBT rights activists
Male musical theatre actors
Serbian male Shakespearean actors
Miloš Žutić Award winners
People convicted of child sexual abuse
People from Mladenovac
Serbian criminals
Serbian dramatists and playwrights
Serbian film directors
Serbian film producers
Serbian male film actors
Serbian male stage actors
Serbian male television actors
Serbian male voice actors
Serbian television directors
Serbian tenors
Serbian theatre directors
University of Arts in Belgrade alumni
Zoran Radmilović Award winners
Writers from Belgrade